The Alexander Aircraft Company was an aircraft manufacturer founded in Colorado in 1925. It was briefly the world's largest aircraft manufacturer but fell victim to the Great Depression and became bankrput in 1932.

History

Founding
The company began life as an offshoot of the Alexander Film Company  that specialized in film advertising, and the younger J. Don Alexander decided that they could sell more advertising if they had airplanes. He wrote to aircraft manufacturers asking for a quote on 50 airplanes, but the builders ignored his letter as the work of a crackpot. Alexander decided to build his own. He moved his operation to Englewood, Colorado and set up the aircraft company. He sent Justin McInaney to Marshall, Missouri to buy an airplane and learn to fly. Justin's instructor was the great Ben O. Howard, who later became famous as a racer and test pilot. Justin bought a Swallow airplane for $2,300 and flew it back to Denver, a trip with many forced landings. Justin then taught others to fly, including Jack Frye (later president of TWA) and airplane designer Al Mooney. Sales of the aircraft reached eight aircraft a day, just before the depression hit.

Disaster
By 1928, the company was having trouble meeting demand from its jury-rigged factory in Englewood. Operating from a small town enabled the company to evade fire and building codes, but there were rumours that Englewood would be annexed by nearby Denver and regulations would be enforced.  The company directors began to prepare for a move to other cities while using the threat of leaving to extort concessions out of the town.

Just before noon on 20 April 1928, a fire started in the shed where aircraft wings were coated with highly flammable cellulose nitrate 'dope.'  A back room was crowded with seamstresses sewing fabric. All of the windows were high and barred, the walls and floors were soaked in the flammable chemical, as were the uniforms of the workers, with the only exits from the building in the doping room which opened inwards.  The doping shed was engulfed in fire and explosions, the exits became crowded with fleeing workers, and eleven workers were burned alive. Many others were horribly burned.

Both Alexander brothers and three other company officials were charged with voluntary manslaughter. But pleaded guilty to failure to provide sufficient means of escape, failure to have doors opening outward, failure to provide proper ventilation, and failure to provide proper sanitation in exchange for the manslaughter charge being dropped. They were fined $1,000 and given suspended 90-day jail sentences.

Expansion

With its Englewood  factory closed by the Arapahoe County Sheriff, they moved overnight to new facilities they were building in Colorado Springs.

By 1931 the company had an established manufacturing plant between Pikeview and Roswell in El Paso County, west of the Atchison, Topeka and Santa Fe Railway and U.S. Route 85. The company went bankrupt in August 1932 and was acquired by Aircraft Mechanics Inc., founded by W. F. Theis and Proctor W. Nichols, in April 1937. It produced components for the Douglas Aircraft Company during World War II, US Air Force ejection seats, and Space Shuttle crew seats.

Legacy
For a brief period from  1928 to 1929, Alexander was the largest aircraft manufacturer in the world, and more aircraft were built in Colorado than anywhere else in the world.  In the early 1930s, the firm built a revolutionary new plane—the forerunner of modern aircraft, with a low wing and retractable gear—called the "Bullet". Several of them crashed in the testing process because the government insisted that the unspinnable plane be tail-spun. The plane later was certificated, though, and became famous in racing and civil aviation. The depression and losses suffered in the Bullet program forced the aircraft firm to fold in the mid-1930s.  Alexander would also be known for starting the career of Al Mooney, the founder of Mooney Aircraft, a general aircraft manufacturer that continues in operation in Kerrville, Texas.

Aircraft

Notes

References

External links 

 Sketch of Alexander Aircraft Company manufacturing plant buildings
 Colorado Aviation Historical Society. 
 Alexander Eaglerock in the collection of the Seattle Museum of Flight
 Listing of Alexander model types
 Biography of J. Don Alexander
 The Bullet Project. 
 Al Mooney designs for Alexander Aircraft
 Alexander Industries Collection – History Colorado
 Alexander Industries Records – Pikes Peak Library District

Defunct aircraft manufacturers of the United States